Yarijan-e Khaleseh (also Romanized as Yārījān-e Khāleşeh) is a village in Zarrineh Rud Rural District, in the Central District of Miandoab County, West Azerbaijan Province, Iran. At the 2006 census, its population was 950, in 252 families. This village is populated by Azerbaijani Turks.

References 

Populated places in Miandoab County